Čimelice is a municipality and village in Písek District in the South Bohemian Region of the Czech Republic. It has about 1,000 inhabitants.

Administrative parts
The village of Krsice is an administrative part of Čimelice.

Geography
It lies in the Tábor Uplands. The Skalice River (a tributary of the Otava) flows through the municipality. In the municipality there are several large ponds: Bisingrovský, Lipšice, Nerestec, Stejskal, Valný and Zástava. Small ponds of Kostelák and Pivovarský are in the centre of Čimelice.

History

The first written mention of Čimelice is from 1400. The village of Krsice was founded in 1233. After 1720, a set of connected fish ponds was established here.

Transport
Čimelice lies along the R4 Expressway, which connects the South Bohemian Region with Prague. In the municipality there is a railway station on the Písek–Zdice line.

Sights
The most notable landmarks are the Church of Holy Trinity and the Čimelice Castle with its English park. The church was built at the turn of the 15th and 16th centuries, and expanded with a tower built in 1800–1820. The castle was built in 1728–1730.

References

External links

Villages in Písek District